Louis IV (d. January 19, 1336), Count of Looz (1323-1336) and Count of Chiny (as Louis VI) (1313-1336), son of Arnold V, Count of Looz and Chiny, and Marguerite Vianden.

His father relinquished the County of Chiny to Louis in 1313 and abdicated in Borgloon in 1323. He supported Adolph of La March, Prince-Bishop of Liège, in several conflicts, including that of February 4, 1325, when rioters attacked the castle at Momalle. Later, Louis mediated the peace in this conflict.

In 1313, he married Margaret of Lorraine, widow of Guy de Dampierre, Count of Zeeland, and daughter of Theobald II, Duke of Lorraine and Isabella of Rumigny. They had no children.

In 1331, he give his nephew Arnold d'Oreye and his mother Jeanne (daughter of Arnold V) full possession of the manor of Rumigny.  Upon his death, and his nephew Thierry de Heinsberg became his successor in both Looz and Chiny.

Sources 

Marchandisse, Alain, La fonction épiscopale à Liège aux XIII° et XIV° siècles: étude de politologie historique, Bibliothèque de la Faculté de Philosophie et de Lettres de l'Université de Liège, 1998

Arlette Laret-Kayser, Entre Bar et Luxembourg : Le Comté de Chiny des Origines à 1300, Bruxelles (éditions du Crédit Communal, Collection Histoire, série in-8°, n° 72), 1986

Medieval Lands Project, Upper Lotharingian Nobility, Comtes de Looz

1336 deaths
Chiny